Aygildino (Aygilde) is a rural locality (a village) in Chishminsky Selsoviet, Birsky District, Bashkortostan, Russia. The population was 109 as of 2010. There are 3 streets.

Geography 
Aygildino is located 32 km southwest of Birsk (the district's administrative centre) by road. Pioner is the nearest rural locality.

References 

Rural localities in Birsky District